Jau-Dignac-et-Loirac is a commune in the Gironde department in Nouvelle-Aquitaine in southwestern France.

Population

See also
Communes of the Gironde department
 Château Saint-Aubin

References

Communes of Gironde